Saint John Ogilvie High School is a Roman Catholic secondary state school located in the Burnbank area of Hamilton, South Lanarkshire, Scotland.

Bus crash
On 4 June 2004, more than 200 students and about 10 staff from John Ogilvie High School and Coltness High School were travelling to Lightwater Valley theme park when they were involved in an accident at East Layton.  Fifty-four children were injured in the crash, and three children were kept in hospital overnight, but there were no serious injuries.

Rebuilding of the school
South Lanarkshire council announced on 22 August 2005 that it had gained planning permission to rebuild John Ogilvie, as well as several other high schools in the area, as part of a multi-million pound deal to modernise local schools. The new school was opened for the beginning of the 2008 school year with new facilities for each department.

Academic performance
The school was involved in March 2007 in a row over the standard of teaching given to some students.

In August 2017, the school reported record high results. They broke some more records in 2018, 2019  and again in 2022. Grade inflation much?

Renaming
The school was known as "St Cuthbert's High School" until 1960 when it changed its name to "John Ogilvie High School".

In March 2015, to celebrate the 400th anniversary of the martyrdom of Saint John Ogilvie, the school under the leadership of head teacher Edward Morrison officially changed its name from "John Ogilvie High School" to "Saint John Ogilve High School."

Notable former pupils
 Jim Mullen, chief executive (CEO) of Ladbrokes
Monica Lennon, MSP for Central Scotland

References

External links
 School Website
 South Lanarkshire Council Website
John Ogilvie High School's page on Scottish Schools Online

Secondary schools in South Lanarkshire
Buildings and structures in Hamilton, South Lanarkshire
Catholic secondary schools in South Lanarkshire
Blantyre, South Lanarkshire